Thomas Hele may refer to:

 Sir Thomas Hele, 1st Baronet (1595–1670), English MP
 Thomas Hele (died 1665) (1630–1665), MP for Plympton Erle in 1661
 Thomas Hele (academic) (1881–1953), academic